Hans Peter Ströer (born 1956) in Munich is a German jazz musician and composer.

Life and career 
At the age of seven, Ströer was already composing his own rock 'n' roll pieces on the guitar, and at eleven he founded his first band. Ströer studied music theory and piano at the Richard Strauss Conservatory in the 1960s and then at the Hochschule für Musik in Munich.

At 17, he worked as a theatre musician. At the same time, he became a sought-after studio musician and participated in recordings by Eberhard Schoener, Falco, Donna Summer, Amanda Lear, La Bionda and Gilbert Bécaud.

In addition, he was active as a music producer (including for Udo Lindenberg's albums between 1986 and 1998, which received several Goldene Schallplatten).

The percussionist  is his younger brother, with whom he played in the group Ströer Brothers and contributed to the official German cultural contribution  to the Olympic Arts Festival at the 1988 Summer Olympics in Seoul.

Filmography (selection) 

 1987: Reichshauptstadt – privat
 1987: Eine geschlossene Gesellschaft
 1993: Wehner – die unerzählte Geschichte
 1997: 
 1999: Einfach raus
 2001: Die Manns – Ein Jahrhundertroman
 2005: 
 2005: Speer und Er
 2008: Buddenbrooks
 2013: Eine mörderische Entscheidung
 2014: Ein blinder Held – Die Liebe des Otto Weidt
 2014: Meine Tochter Anne Frank
 2016: Letzte Ausfahrt Gera – Acht Stunden mit Beate Zschäpe
 2016: Tatort: Borowski und das verlorene Mädchen
 2019: Brecht

References

External links 
 
 
 
 

Jazz fusion bass guitarists
German record producers
German film score composers
1956 births
Living people
Musicians from Munich